Statistics of 2003 National Football Championship (Bangladesh).

Overview
Muktijoddha Sangsad KC won the championship.

First stage

Group 1

Group 2

Playoff

Semifinals
Wanderers Club 0-1 Muktijoddha Sangsad KC
Mohammedan SC 1-0 Abahani Ltd

Final
Mohammedan SC 1-1 (pen 2–3) Muktijoddha Sangsad KC
Muktijoddha Sangsad KC won the championship.

References
RSSSF

 
1